Cryptoerithus is a genus of Australian ground spiders that was first described by William Joseph Rainbow in 1915. Originally placed with the long-spinneret ground spiders, it was transferred to the ground spiders in 2018.

Species
 it contains nineteen species, found in Western Australia, South Australia, Queensland, and the Northern Territory:
Cryptoerithus annaburroo Platnick & Baehr, 2006 – Australia (Northern Territory)
Cryptoerithus griffith Platnick & Baehr, 2006 – Australia (Queensland, South Australia)
Cryptoerithus halifax Platnick & Baehr, 2006 – Australia (South Australia)
Cryptoerithus halli Platnick & Baehr, 2006 – Australia (Western Australia)
Cryptoerithus harveyi Platnick & Baehr, 2006 – Australia (Western Australia)
Cryptoerithus hasenpuschi Platnick & Baehr, 2006 – Australia (Queensland)
Cryptoerithus lawlessi Platnick & Baehr, 2006 – Australia (Queensland)
Cryptoerithus melindae Platnick & Baehr, 2006 – Australia (Western Australia)
Cryptoerithus nichtaut Platnick & Baehr, 2006 – Australia (Queensland)
Cryptoerithus ninan Platnick & Baehr, 2006 – Australia (Western Australia)
Cryptoerithus nonaut Platnick & Baehr, 2006 – Australia (Northern Territory, South Australia)
Cryptoerithus nopaut Platnick & Baehr, 2006 – Australia (Western Australia)
Cryptoerithus nyetaut Platnick & Baehr, 2006 – Australia (Northern Territory)
Cryptoerithus occultus Rainbow, 1915 (type) – Australia (Western Australia, Northern Territory, South Australia)
Cryptoerithus quamby Platnick & Baehr, 2006 – Australia (Queensland)
Cryptoerithus quobba Platnick & Baehr, 2006 – Southern Australia
Cryptoerithus rough Platnick & Baehr, 2006 – Australia (South Australia)
Cryptoerithus shadabi Platnick & Baehr, 2006 – Southern Australia
Cryptoerithus stuart Platnick & Baehr, 2006 – Australia (Northern Territory)

See also
 List of Gnaphosidae species

References

Araneomorphae genera
Gnaphosidae
Spiders of South Africa
Taxa named by William Joseph Rainbow